John Ernest Silkin (18 March 1923 – 26 April 1987) was a British left-wing Labour politician and solicitor.

Early life
He was the third son of Lewis Silkin, 1st Baron Silkin, and a younger brother of Samuel Silkin, Baron Silkin of Dulwich. He was educated at Dulwich College, the University of Wales and Trinity Hall, Cambridge. Silkin served in the Royal Naval Volunteer Reserve from 1942 to 1946. He was later promoted lieutenant. He was demobilised in 1946 and returned to Cambridge.

Silkin was admitted as a solicitor in 1950 and worked for his father's law practice in London.

Parliamentary career
He contested the seat of St Marylebone for the Labour Party at the 1950 general election, West Woolwich in 1951 and South Nottingham in 1959. He served as a councillor in the Metropolitan Borough of St Marylebone (1962–63) and was elected to the House of Commons for the first time in July 1963. He served as the Labour Member of Parliament for Deptford (1963–74) and for Lewisham, Deptford (1974–87).

He was appointed to the Privy Council in 1966. He served as a Government Chief Whip (1966–69) and as the deputy leader of the House of Commons (1968–69). He was appointed as the Minister of Public Buildings and Works (1969–70) and the Minister for Planning and Local Government in the Department for the Environment (1974–76). He served as the Minister of Agriculture, Fisheries and Food (1976–79).

In opposition, Silkin was an unsuccessful candidate in the 1980 Labour leadership election following the resignation of James Callaghan and in the deputy leadership election in 1981. He served as Opposition Spokesman on Industry (1979–80), Shadow Leader of the House of Commons (1980–83), Shadow Defence Secretary (1981–83) and the Dairy Industry Arbitrator (1986–87).

Silkin's publication, Changing Battlefields: The Challenge to the Labour Party appeared posthumously. His papers were given to the Churchill Archives Centre by his widow in February 1990. These cover his Parliamentary and Ministerial career, as well as his other public interests, such as the Channel Tunnel, the European Economic Community and the dairy industry. There is material of particular interest concerning his relationship with his Constituency Labour Party in Deptford and on the Labour Party Leadership and Deputy Leadership Elections in 1980 and 1981.

Family
He was married to the actress Rosamund John from 1950 until his death in 1987. Their son Rory L. F. Silkin was born in 1954. Rory has a daughter called Natasha Silkin, who also works in politics for Hanover Communications.

External links 
 
 The Papers of John Ernest Silkin held at Churchill Archives Centre

References 

|-

|-

|-

|-

|-

|-

|-

|-

|-

|-

|-

|-

|-

|-

1923 births
1987 deaths
Agriculture ministers of the United Kingdom
Alumni of the University of Wales
Alumni of Trinity Hall, Cambridge
European democratic socialists
English Jews
English people of Lithuanian-Jewish descent
Labour Party (UK) MPs for English constituencies
Members of the Privy Council of the United Kingdom
Members of St Marylebone Metropolitan Borough Council
People educated at Dulwich College
Royal Naval Volunteer Reserve personnel of World War II
Royal Navy officers of World War II
Treasurers of the Household
UK MPs 1983–1987
UK MPs 1959–1964
UK MPs 1964–1966
UK MPs 1966–1970
UK MPs 1970–1974
UK MPs 1974
UK MPs 1974–1979
UK MPs 1979–1983
Younger sons of barons
Jewish British politicians
Ministers in the Wilson governments, 1964–1970